Festuca subulata is a species of grass known by the common names bearded fescue and nodding fescue. It is native to the northwestern quarter of North America, from Alaska to South Dakota to northern California, where it is most often found in moist mountain forests.

This fescue is a loosely clumping perennial grass with small rhizomes. The stems are generally between 40 and 80 centimeters in height and have drooping leaves. The inflorescence has loosely clustered spikelets. The plant reproduces by seed and rhizome and it sometimes spreads via stolon.

External links
Jepson Manual Treatment
USDA Plants Profile 
Ecology
Photo gallery

subulata
Native grasses of California
Grasses of the United States
Grasses of Canada
Flora of North America